Cenk Tosun (born 7 June 1991) is a professional footballer who plays as a striker for Süper Lig club Beşiktaş and the Turkey national team.

After making one Bundesliga appearance for Eintracht Frankfurt, he transferred to Gaziantepspor in January 2011, where he won the Spor Toto Cup in 2012. In 2014, he was signed by Beşiktaş and won two Süper Lig titles before transferring to Everton in January 2018 for a reported £27 million transfer fee.

Tosun was born in Germany and represented the country from under-16 to under-21 level. He then changed his allegiance to Turkey, for whom he made his senior international debut with in 2013, and played at UEFA Euro 2016.

Club career

Eintracht Frankfurt
Born in Wetzlar in the German state of Hesse, Tosun began his career with Eintracht Frankfurt. He played mainly for the reserves in the Regionalliga. His sole first team appearance was on 8 May 2010 in the final match of the 2009–10 Bundesliga season as a 75th-minute substitute for Martin Fenin in a 3–1 loss at VfL Wolfsburg.

Gaziantepspor
On 29 January 2011, Tosun joined Gaziantepspor for a €400,000 transfer fee. He scored 10 goals in 14 league matches in his debut season. After a less successful second season, he scored double digits in the following two campaigns and helped the club win the Spor Toto Cup in 2012. He scored twice in the final, a 3–1 win over Orduspor on 17 May 2012.

Beşiktaş

On 4 February 2014, Beşiktaş signed Tosun on a five-year contract worth nearly €500,000, effective from the 2014–15 season. He chose the number 23 shirt after basketball player Michael Jordan. In his first two campaigns at the Istanbul club, he was mainly a substitute, behind Demba Ba and Mario Gómez in the pecking order. After Ba and Gómez left, he was a regular in the 2016–17 season, scoring 24 goals as his club won the Süper Lig title. He then turned down a move to Premier League club Crystal Palace.

In 2017–18, Tosun scored four goals in six match as Beşiktaş won a UEFA Champions League group containing RB Leipzig, Porto and Monaco, including both of a 2–1 win at Monaco on 17 October.

Everton
On 5 January 2018, Tosun joined Premier League club Everton for a reported £27 million transfer fee, signing a four-and-a-half-year contract with the Merseyside club. He made his debut eight days later, playing 61 minutes of a 4–0 loss away to Tottenham Hotspur. He scored his first goal for the club in a 2–1 away loss against Burnley on 3 March. Manager Sam Allardyce praised Tosun when he received criticism for the start of his Everton career. Tosun and fellow new signing Theo Walcott helped an Everton side that had struggled for goals in the first half of the season as the club finished in eighth place in the 2017–18 Premier League.

Under new manager Marco Silva, Tosun lost his starting place to Dominic Calvert-Lewin and Moise Kean. However, he stayed at the club for the 2019–20 season after rejecting moves to Galatasaray S.K. and Qatar's Al-Gharafa SC.

Loan to Crystal Palace

Tosun moved on loan to Crystal Palace for the rest of the 2019–20 season on 10 January 2020. He made his debut the next day against Arsenal when he came on for Max Meyer in the 68th minute of the 1–1 home draw. In his next game, a first start on 18 January, he scored in a 2–2 draw away to reigning champions Manchester City.

In March, Tosun was sidelined with an anterior cruciate ligament injury picked up during training. He returned to Everton for rehabilitation once surgery had been completed.

Loan to Beşiktaş

On 31 January 2021, Tosun returned to Beşiktaş on a loan deal until the end of the season. On his league debut on 15 February, he came on as a 62nd-minute replacement for Vincent Aboubakar and scored twice in a 3–0 win at Gençlerbirliği. He subsequently suffered another knee injury and was diagnosed with COVID-19.  On June 10, the BBC reported he would leave the club at the end of the month once his contract expired.

Return to Beşiktaş
On 2 July 2022, Tosun signed with Beşiktaş for a third stint with the club.

International career

Germany youth
Tosun played for Germany under-19 in qualification for the 2010 UEFA European Under-19 Championship. In the qualifying group in Luxembourg, he scored twice in a 5–0 win over Moldova and a consolation goal in a 2–1 loss to Turkey. He scored a hat-trick in a 4–1 win over Poland in the Elite Round, but Germany did not advance to the finals in France.

On 16 November 2010, Tosun made his under-21 debut in a 2–0 friendly win over England in Wiesbaden, scoring a penalty for the second goal.

Turkey

Tosun made his senior international debut for Turkey on 15 October 2013, replacing Selçuk İnan for the final 16 minutes of a 2–0 loss to the Netherlands in a 2014 FIFA World Cup qualifying match at the Şükrü Saracoğlu Stadium in Istanbul; the result ended the Turks' hope of qualification. On 13 November 2015, he scored his first international goal, the winner in a 2–1 friendly triumph away to Qatar. He added another two goals on 24 March 2016 in a 2–1 friendly win over Sweden in Antalya.

Tosun was part of the 23-man squad chosen by head coach Fatih Terim for UEFA Euro 2016 in France. He started in the opening match, a 1–0 loss to Croatia, but was dropped in favour of Burak Yılmaz for the following match against Spain. Tosun then returned as an added-time substitute in the 2–0 win over the Czech Republic in Lens that was not enough to take Turkey to the round of 16.

In Turkey's failed qualification campaign for the 2018 World Cup, Tosun scored five goals. These were braces in both matches against Finland, and the only goal of a home win over eventual qualifiers Croatia on 5 September 2017. On 1 June 2018, Tosun scored a penalty to open a 2–2 friendly draw with Tunisia in Geneva, then was sent-off for the first time in his career for a confrontation with the Turkish fans; he said he intervened because he thought his father was being attacked in the crowd.

Tosun was Turkey's top scorer with five goals in Turkey's successful UEFA Euro 2020 qualifying. These included braces in home and away 4–0 wins over Moldova.

Style of play
Tosun has said his ability is equal with his left and right foot, as his father Senol forbade him from using his right foot in an attempt to strengthen his left. As a boy, he idolised Argentine forward Gabriel Batistuta. While Tosun likens himself to Mario Gómez and Zlatan Ibrahimović, The Times writer Gary Jacob instead found him more similar to the English strikers Kevin Davies and Andy Carroll for his physicality.

Political views
On 11 October 2019, Tosun scored in the 90th minute of a 1–0 home win over Albania in a Euro 2020 qualifier, and was one of the Turkish players who participated in a "military salute" goal celebration. That same day, he published a photograph on Instagram in which he stated support for soldiers involved in the Turkish offensive into north-eastern Syria.

Career statistics

Club

International

Scores and results list Turkey's goal tally first, score column indicates score after each Tosun goal.

Honours
Gaziantepspor
Spor Toto Cup: 2011–12 

Beşiktaş
Süper Lig: 2015–16, 2016–17, 2020–21
Türkiye Kupası: 2020–21

References

External links

Profile at the Everton F.C. website

Official website 

1991 births
Living people
German people of Turkish descent
People from Wetzlar
Sportspeople from Giessen (region)
Footballers from Hesse
German footballers
Citizens of Turkey through descent
Turkish footballers
Association football forwards
Eintracht Frankfurt II players
Eintracht Frankfurt players
Gaziantepspor footballers
Beşiktaş J.K. footballers
Everton F.C. players
Crystal Palace F.C. players
Bundesliga players
Süper Lig players
Premier League players
Germany youth international footballers
Germany under-21 international footballers
Turkey under-21 international footballers
Turkey B international footballers
Turkey international footballers
UEFA Euro 2016 players
German expatriate footballers
Turkish expatriate footballers
German expatriate sportspeople in England
Turkish expatriate sportspeople in England
Expatriate footballers in England